Augyles feai, is a species of variegated mud-loving beetle found in India, Myanmar, Nepal, Sri Lanka, Philippines, and Pakistan.

References 

Byrrhoidea
Insects of Sri Lanka
Beetles described in 1896